Big or BIG may refer to:

 Big, of great size or degree

Film and television
 Big (film), a 1988 fantasy-comedy film starring Tom Hanks
 Big!, a Discovery Channel television show
 Richard Hammond's Big, a television show presented by Richard Hammond
 Big (TV series), a 2012 South Korean TV series
 Banana Island Ghost, a 2017 fantasy action comedy film

Music
 Big: the musical, a 1996 musical based on the film
 Big Records, a record label
 Big! (Betty Who album)
 Big (album), a 2007 album by Macy Gray
 "Big" (Brassmunk song)
 "Big" (Dead Letter Circus song)
 "Big" (Fontaines D.C. song)
 "Big" (Juice Wrld song)
 "Big" (Sneaky Sound System song)
 "Big" (Rita Ora and Imanbek song)
 "Big" (Young M.A song)
 "Big", a 1990 song by New Fast Automatic Daffodils
 "Big", a 2021 song by Jade Eagleson from Honkytonk Revival
The Notorious B.I.G., an American rapper
B.I.G (band), a South Korean boy band

Places
 Allen Army Airfield (IATA code), Alaska, US
 BIG, a VOR navigational beacon at London Biggin Hill Airport
 Big River (disambiguation), various rivers (and other things)
 Big Island (disambiguation), various islands (and other things)

Organizations
 , the national mapping agency of Indonesia
 Beijing Institute of Genomics, a Chinese institute for genetic research
 Big Ten Conference, an American college sports conference which uses the singular word "B1G" (the numeral "1" replacing the letter "I") within their logo
 Bjarke Ingels Group, a Danish architecture firm
 Bundesimmobiliengesellschaft, an Austrian quasi-governmental company
 , a Belgian information centre for dangerous goods
 Breast International Group, for breast cancer research

Fictional characters
 Big the Cat, in the Sonic the Hedgehog game universe
 Big, a Buddhist monk in the 2003 film Running on Karma
 Big, in The Perhapanauts comic book series
 Big, in Big & Small children's TV Series
 Big (character), from Sex and the City

Other uses
 Kunimaipa language (ISO 639-3 code: big), of Papua New Guinea
 Basic income grant
 BIG Namibia, the basic income grant pilot project at Omitara, Namibia
 Operation Big, an Allied task force assigned to obtain German nuclear secrets during the final days of World War II
 Big (video game player), American player Terry Chuong
 A nickname of Fred T. Long (1896–1966), American Negro league baseball player and college football coach
 , an HTML element
 BIG, a type of Non-RAID drive architectures used to concatenate multiple disks to appear as a single big disk
 Business is a Game, a type of business war games
 The Bigs, 2007 video game
 Big (wine), a term in wine tasting

See also

 Mr. Big (disambiguation)
 The Big Show (disambiguation)
 Big cat (disambiguation)